Pinjra is a Pakistani drama television series directed by Najaf Bilgrami, written by late-Pakistani screenwriter Asma Nabeel. The series is produced by Shazia Wajahat under banner Showcase Productions. It is set to premier on 6 October 2022 on ARY Digital with double episodes every week. The series stars Hadiqa Kiani, Omair Rana, with child actors Aashir Wajahat , Aina Asif , Muhammad Hassaan  and Ahmed Usman in leading roles.

The series received positive reviews due to its subject of parenting techniques and children’s issues.

Plot 

Abaan (Ahmed Usman) is a troubled young kid, who lives in a very strict family. His interests lie in art and music, whereas his father Javed (Omair Rana) tells him that these are useless subjects and scolds him for pursuing them. Abaan's mother Khadjia (Hadiqa Kiani) is also very strict, but she understands Abaan's feelings and she can't stand up for herself against her husband. Abaan's older brother Azaan (Aashir Wajahat) is the good kid and he always makes his parents proud, whereas his sister Abeer (Aina Asif) is the complete opposite, since she has a phone, unbeknownst to her parents, and is very politically active on social media. Khadija's friend Wajiha (Sunita Marshall) is a divorcee since she had an abusive husband named Sheharyar. Her two kids, Fardan (Zuhab Khan) and Dua (Emaan Khan), both support her and so does her servant, Firoza Bi (Fareeha Jabeen).

One day, Abaan fails his tests, and his father and sister both call him losers and a disappointment, and Javed threatens to send Abaan to boarding school, but Azaan convinces him that he will help Abaan study and be better at his studies. Khadija finds out about Abeer's phone, but her friend secretly gifts her another one. Abaan then befriends a rich kid named Bilal, and he gives Abaan drugs to get rid of his tensions. Abaan steals money from Javed's wallet to give to Bilal for the drugs. One day, Azaan becomes "Head Boy" of the university, but Abeer gets in trouble for bullying a girl on social media, and Abaan finds a kid named Umer trash talking Abeer. Abaan and Umer fight, but Abaan accidentally lets Umer fall over the balcony, sending him to the hospital.

Since Umer is a rich kid, his father gets Abaan arrested. During the investigation, the school finds out about Abaan and the drugs, and they take this matter to court. But it turns out that Javed's lawyer is actually working for Umer's father and he says he will try to make sure that he won't let Abaan's bail happen. Wajiha meets Arsalan (Furqan Qureshi), who happens to be a lawyer, so Khadija tries to hire him, but Javed intervenes, thinking that Wajiha and Arsalan are having an affair, since he doesn't like Wajiha.

Cast 
 Hadiqa Kiani as Khadija
 Ali Siddiqui as Saleem
 Omair Rana as Javaid
 Aashir Wajahat as Azaan
 Ahmed Usman as Abaan
 Muhammad Hassaan as Abeer's Boyfriend 
 Aina Asif as Abeer
 Sunita Marshall as Wajiha
 Emaan Khan as Dua
 Zuhab Khan as Fardan
 Fareeha Jabeen as Feroza Bi
 Jinaan Hussain as Rabia
 Zhalay Sarhadi as Fareeda, School Principal
 Furqan Qureshi as Arsalan
 Sharique Mehmood as Bakht

Production

Producer Shaiza Wajaht revealed in September 2021 that pre-production work on the last script of screenwriter and playwright Asma Nabeel, has been started. She revealed that Najaf Bilgrami will direct the series who was also the director of Nabeel's 2019 series Damsa. In December 2021, it reported that singer turned actress Hadiqa Kiani has been cast in the leading role with Omair Rana and Aashir Wajahat. It marked her third acting project after Raqeeb Se and Dobara.

References 

2022 Pakistani television series debuts
Pakistani drama television series